Super Soccer, known in Japan as , is a football (soccer) video game developed by Human Entertainment for the Super NES. Human published the game by themselves in Japan whereas Nintendo did it overseas. It was released in Japan in 1991 and in the United States and Europe in 1992. It was on the Super NES launch lineup in Europe, due to the sport's popularity. In 2017, it was rereleased in Japan as part of the Japanese  Super NES Classic Edition. The game has also been included in the SNES app available for Nintendo Switch Online subscribers.

Gameplay

The game consists of exhibition games and tournament games. In exhibition, one can choose to play either a match or a shootout (which is not available in the Japanese version). In tournament mode, one plays until one beats all other teams. After beating all the national teams, the player must play one final team, Nintendo (Human in the Japanese version). When the tournament has been won, the player receives a code to play the game in a more advanced mode.

Series
Originally, Formation Soccer was a PC Engine native game that was released before the 1990 FIFA World Cup. The series was then carried over to Super Nintendo, with the addition of the prefix "Super". Meanwhile, two sequels of Formation Soccer for the PC Engine were spawned. In 1995, Hyper Formation Soccer was released for the PlayStation, and later it was released two more Formation Soccer games for that console. In 2002, Formation Soccer 2002 was released by Spike, for the Game Boy Advance.

Super Formation Soccer spawned four sequels, all of them developed and published by Human in Japan only.

 Super Formation Soccer II (1993)
 Super Formation Soccer 94 (1994)
Was made specially for the then-upcoming 1994 FIFA World Cup, including the 24 teams that partook it, plus Japan.
 Super Formation Soccer 95: della Serie A (1995)
Instead of national teams, this game featured all clubs from the Italian Serie A (SEASON 1994-95 Serie A).
 Super Formation Soccer 96: World Club Edition (1996)
It was the last game to date in the series. It featured 18 fictitious club teams (13 European, four Latin American and one Japanese) from around the world, based on well-known teams by the time.

Reception

Super Gamer gave an overall review score of 63% writing "Once one of the best footie sims, competition from more recent releases has made this seem painfully slow and unsophisticated."

See also
 Super Goal! 2

References

External links
 Super Soccer at MobyGames
 Super Formation Soccer at superfamicom.org
  1UP, differences between the Japanese and the Western versions.
  スーパーフォーメーションサッカー / Super Formation Soccer at super-famicom.jp

1991 video games
Association football video games
Human Entertainment games
Kadokawa Dwango franchises
Multiplayer and single-player video games
Super Nintendo Entertainment System games
Video games developed in Japan
Nintendo Switch Online games